Regina High School may refer to:

Regina High School (Iowa), Iowa City, Iowa
Regina High School (Michigan), Warren, Michigan
Regina High School (Ohio), South Euclid, Ohio
Regina High School (Washington), New York, Hawaii